Gorenje Kamenje pri Dobrniču is a small settlement in the hills northwest of Dobrnič in the Municipality of Trebnje in eastern Slovenia. The area is part of the historical region of Lower Carniola. The municipality is now included in the Southeast Slovenia Statistical Region.

Name
The name of the settlement was changed from Gorenje Kamenje to Gorenje Kamenje pri Dobrniču in 1953.

References

External links
Gorenje Kamenje pri Dobrniču at Geopedia

Populated places in the Municipality of Trebnje